Alexei Mikhailovich Ugarov (born November 2, 1985) is a Belarusian professional ice hockey forward. He is currently an unrestricted free agent who most recently played for Severstal Cherepovets of the Kontinental Hockey League (KHL). He previously played three seasons for HC Nizhnekamsk Neftekhimik in the Russian Super League.

Ugarov was selected for the Belarus national men's ice hockey team in the 2010 Winter Olympics. He also participated at the 2010 IIHF World Championship as a member of the Belarus National men's ice hockey team.

Career statistics

Regular season and playoffs

International

References

External links

1985 births
Admiral Vladivostok players
Amur Khabarovsk players
Belarusian ice hockey left wingers
Expatriate ice hockey players in Russia
HC MVD players
HC Neftekhimik Nizhnekamsk players
Ice hockey players at the 2010 Winter Olympics
Living people
Olympic ice hockey players of Belarus
Severstal Cherepovets players
Ice hockey people from Minsk